The 2000–01 A Group was the 53rd season of the A Football Group, the top Bulgarian professional league for association football clubs, since its establishment in 1948. 

The league was contested by the top 12 teams from the 1999–2000 season as well as Cherno More Varna and Hebar Pazardzhik, who joined as the promoted clubs from the 1999–2000 B Group. 

Defending champions Levski Sofia won their 22nd Bulgarian league title overall. Botev Plovdiv and Minyor Pernik were relegated at the end of the season by finishing in the last two places.

Teams
Fourteen teams competed in the league – the top twelve teams from the previous season and the two teams promoted from the B Group. The promoted teams were Cherno More Varna (returning to the top flight after a six-year absence) and Hebar Pazardzhik (returning after an eight-year absence). They replaced Dobrudzha Dobrich, Belasitsa Petrich, Pirin Blagoevgrad and Shumen.

Stadiums and Locations

Personnel and kits

Managerial changes

League standings

Results

Relegation play-off

Champions
Levski Sofia

Pažin, Koval, Aleksandrov, Tsykhmeystruk, Kaynov and Georgiev left the club during a season.

Top scorers

Source:2000–01 Top Goalscorers

References

External links
Bulgaria Championship History at rsssf.com
2000–01 A Group Statistics at a-pfg.com

First Professional Football League (Bulgaria) seasons
Bulgaria
1